Choristoneura chapana is a species of moth of the family Tortricidae. It is found in Vietnam.

The wingspan is about 22 mm. The forewings are dark grey with brownish admixture, sprinkled, strigulated (finely streaked) and partly suffused with rust and purple rust.

Etymology
The species name refers to the old name of the type locality, Cha-pa (Sa Pa).

References

Moths described in 2008
Choristoneura